Kazem Borjlou (born November 22, 1980) is an Iranian footballer.

Career
Borjlou joined Steel Azin F.C. in 2009 after spending his entire career with Saipa F.C. He rejoined Saipa in summer 2012 with a two-years contract.

Club career statistics

 Assist Goals

References

External links

1980 births
Living people
Saipa F.C. players
Paykan F.C. players
Iranian footballers
Steel Azin F.C. players
Association football defenders